Jūrkalne is a village in Latvia. It is the centre of a parish of the same name within Ventspils Municipality on the Baltic coast. Its former German name was Feliksberg (Felixberg), but its former Latvian name was Medeņciems (Meddenzeem).

Jūrkalne was the birthplace of Abraham Zevi Idelsohn, the Jewish ethnologist and musicologist.

References 

Towns and villages in Latvia
Ventspils Municipality